North East Township is a township in Erie County, Pennsylvania, United States. The population was 6,529 at the 2020 census, up from 6,315 at the 2010 census, down from 7,702 in 2000.

Geography
The township is in the northeastern corner of Erie County and is adjacent to the New York state line. Lake Erie borders the northern edge of the township. The township surrounds the borough of North East, a separate municipality.

North East Township contains Pennsylvania's northernmost point.

Demographics

As of the census of 2000, there were 7,702 people, 2,485 households, and 1,861 families residing in the township.  The population density was 181.8 people per square mile (70.2/km2).  There were 2,691 housing units at an average density of 63.5/sq mi (24.5/km2).  The racial makeup of the township was 97.83% White, 0.88% African American, 0.03% Native American, 0.43% Asian, 0.03% Pacific Islander, 0.25% from other races, and 0.56% from two or more races. Hispanic or Latino of any race were 0.82% of the population.

There were 2,485 households, out of which 34.7% had children under the age of 18 living with them, 64.3% were married couples living together, 7.6% had a female householder with no husband present, and 25.1% were non-families. 21.5% of all households were made up of individuals, and 9.6% had someone living alone who was 65 years of age or older. The average household size was 2.65 and the average family size was 3.10.

In the township the population was spread out, with 23.7% under the age of 18, 19.4% from 18 to 24, 23.8% from 25 to 44, 21.5% from 45 to 64, and 11.6% who were 65 years of age or older. The median age was 33 years. For every 100 females there were 102.0 males. For every 100 females age 18 and over, there were 102.4 males.

The median income for a household in the township was $42,696, and the median income for a family was $51,056. Males had a median income of $37,773 versus $25,707 for females. The per capita income for the township was $16,516. About 3.6% of families and 5.8% of the population were below the poverty line, including 7.0% of those under age 18 and 2.8% of those age 65 or over.

References

External links
North East Township official website

Townships in Erie County, Pennsylvania